The following lists events that happened during 2002 in the Democratic Republic of the Congo.

Incumbents 
 President: Joseph Kabila

Events

 Most foreign invaders withdraw.
 Most forests were earmarked for industrial logging: 43.5 million hectares were the subject of 25-year contracts
 Forest Code enacted

 Tin is discovered in the eastern part of the country but mining remains on a limited scale.
 A United Nations panel recommended sanctions against 29 companies, including the George Forrest Group, for the way their operations did business in the DR Congo. The panel also recommended sanctions against 54 individuals.
 new Mining Code, written with input from the World Bank

January
 January 17 - The eruption of Mount Nyiragongo displaces an estimated 400,000 people.

April
April 19: Sun City Agreement

August
 August 28 - Uganda and Zimbabwe begin pulling their troops out of the Democratic Republic of the Congo.

September
 September 6 - Uganda and the Democratic Republic of the Congo agree to normalise their relations after four years of the Second Congo War.

Births 

 6 October - Jonathan Kuminga, basketball player

References

 
2000s in the Democratic Republic of the Congo
Years of the 21st century in the Democratic Republic of the Congo
Democratic Republic of the Congo
Democratic Republic of the Congo